Andrea Conti may refer to:
 Andrea Conti (footballer, born 1994), Italian football defender for AC Milan
 Andrea Conti (footballer, born 1977), Italian football forward for AC Bellinzona
 Andrea Conti (basketball) (born 1974), Italian basketball player